Arnitz L. Johnson (May 16, 1920  –  June 6, 2000) was an American professional basketball player. He played for the Rochester Royals of the National Basketball League (NBL) and National Basketball Association (NBA) from 1946 to 1953. Johnson is the only basketball player from Bemidji State to play in the NBA.

Early life and college career
Johnson was born on May 16, 1920, in Gonvick, Minnesota. His father was an immigrant from Sweden. Johnson attended Gonvick High School, where he served as a captain on the basketball team and was a four-time letterwinner.

Johnson played college basketball for the Bemidji State Beavers (then Bemidji Teachers). He led the team to three consecutive Northern Teachers College Conference championships that led to berths in the NAIA Men's Basketball Championships.

Johnson served at Buckley Air Force Base during World War II and helped wounded soldiers during their rehabilitation.

Professional career
In 1946, Johnson was playing at an Amateur Athletic Union tournament in Denver when he was spotted by Chuck Taylor, who told Rochester Royals coach and owner Les Harrison about Johnson. Harrison sent Johnson money to travel for a tryout with the team. Johnson played seven seasons (1946–1953) in the National Basketball League and National Basketball Association as a member of the Rochester Royals. He averaged 8.7 points and 6.2 rebounds in his career and won a league championship in 1951.

In 2003, Monroe Community College in New York established the Arnold L. Johnson Endowed Memorial Scholarship for student athletes.

BAA/NBA career statistics

Regular season

Playoffs

References

External links
 

1920 births
2000 deaths
American men's basketball players
American people of Swedish descent
Basketball players from Minnesota
Bemidji State Beavers men's basketball players
People from Clearwater County, Minnesota
Rochester Royals players
Small forwards